James William Simmons (27 June 1889 – June 1972) was an English footballer who played for Sheffield United and West Ham United. He was a fast and at times a brilliant player. He was a nephew of William "Fatty" Foulke but had the opposite physique.
After retiring from football Jimmy Simmons became the Landlord of the Red Lion Public House on Matlock Green, in Matlock in the 1920s. During this time he played cricket for Matlock Cricket Club, and still holds the record Clubs highest score of 165* not out, in a match against Bakewell Cricket Club in 1925.

Club career
Simmons started out with his home side, Blackwell Colliery. In 1908 he transferred to  Sheffield United. He was a member of the Sheffield United team who won the FA Cup final in 1915. The Manchester Guardian stated that he was the most attractive player on the pitch and his quick attacks, which he mixed between runs down the wing and through the centre, left the Chelsea defence standing. He scored the first goal of the match just before half time when he half volleyed a cross into the top corner of the net.

He was at West Ham United, then of the Second Division, for two seasons, joining in 1920. He played his final game for the club on 29 March 1922 but was forced to retire from football thereafter.

Honours
Sheffield United
FA Cup: 1914–15

References

1889 births
1972 deaths
People from Blackwell, Derbyshire
Footballers from Derbyshire
English footballers
English Football League players
Association football forwards
Sheffield United F.C. players
West Ham United F.C. players
FA Cup Final players